Futomi Dam is a gravity dam located in Toyama prefecture in Japan. The dam is used for power production. The catchment area of the dam is 48.2 km2. The dam impounds about 5  ha of land when full and can store 352 thousand cubic meters of water. The construction of the dam was started on 1963 and completed in 1965.

References

Dams in Toyama Prefecture
1965 establishments in Japan